Spiritual autobiography is a genre of non-fiction prose that dominated Protestant writing during the seventeenth century, particularly in England, particularly that of Dissenters. The narrative follows the believer from a state of damnation to a state of grace; the most famous example is perhaps John Bunyan's Grace Abounding (1666). The first known spiritual autobiography is that of Augustine of Hippo, or St. Augustine. He wrote the Confessions and it stands to this day as a classic when studying this genre.

Structure
Because so many autobiographies were written, they began to fall into a predictable pattern. The "formula" began with a sinful youth, "followed by a gradual awakening of spiritual feelings and a sense of anxiety about the prospects for one's soul." The person would repent, fall again into sin, repent, and sin again; such cycles could last for years. The Bible was often a source of comfort or fear during this time. Finally, the person had a conversion experience, an "epiphany, often of an emotionally shattering character, by which individuals came to realise that they had been singled out by God for salvation." Life was not necessarily easy after this, but it was a good deal less traumatic. These overarching narratives were seen to be not only relevant to human life, but also to human history. Those who practiced this type of spiritual autobiography believed that "history repeats itself not only in man's outward, group existence, but in the spiritual life of individuals."

Evolution
The spiritual autobiography's intense focus on the individual has led scholars to see it as a precursor to the novel, with later writers such as Daniel Defoe writing fictionalized accounts of a character's spiritual journey, such as Robinson Crusoe or Moll Flanders. Moreover, because, as G. A. Starr argues, English Protestantism had rejected the "otherworldliness" of Catholicism "and insisted on the compatibility of earthly and spiritual callings," the "utterly mundane activities could be drawn upon to illustrate and enforce religious duties." This also contributed to the growth of what we now know as the novel.

Dating the evolution of this genre to a 17th century Protestant writing practice overlooks the earlier example of Margery Kempe, from the early 1430s (see Wikipedia entry The Book of Margery Kempe: A Facsimile and Documentary Edition, ed. Joel Fredell. Online edition.) 

In the late 20th century, the spiritual autobiography has often reflected the struggle to reconcile variant forms of sexuality with Christian belief traditions, with the element of sincere struggle sometimes producing a polemical tone. Notable among these are titles by Jesuit John J. McNeill, Bothe Feet Firmly Planted in Midair: My Spiritual Journey (Louisville, KY: Westminster John Knox Press); Episcopalian priest Malcolm Boyd, Gay Priest, An Inner Journey (New York: St Martin's Press); Evangelical Minister Mel White's Stranger at the Gate: To Be Gay and Christian in America (New York: Plume/Penguin, 1995); Chris Glaser, self-described originally as a "fundamental Baptist and biblical literalist", published Uncommon Calling: A Gay Man's Struggle to Serve the Church (San Francisco: Harper and Row, 1988).

Beyond the Abrahamic traditions
Recent examples in the genre often come from outside the Abrahamic traditions. See, for example, the expatriate British writer Christopher Isherwood's "My Guru and His Disciple" (London: Methuen, 1980); Jane Hamilton Merritt's "A Meditator's Diary: A Western woman's unique experiences in Thailand Monasteries" (London: Mandala/Unwin paperbacks, 1986); Irina Tweedie's "Daughter of Fire: A Diary of a Spiritual Training with a Sufi Master (Nevada City: Blue Dolphin Publishing, 1986. Originally published as "The Chasm of Fire", 1979); Andrew Harvey's "A Journey in Ladakh: Encounters with Buddhism" (1983) and "Hidden Journey: A Spiritual Awakening" (1991); Mark Matousek's "Sex Death Enlightenment: A True Story" (1996) and Victor Marsh's "The Boy in the Yellow Dress" (Melbourne: Clouds of Magellan Press, 2014). 
Worth considering too is Carol P. Christ's "Laughter of Aphrodite: Reflections on a Journey to the Goddess" (Harper San Francisco, 1988).

Insightful work coming from the contemporary encounter of Western aspirants with Buddhism, includes Stephen Batchelor's "Confession of a Buddhist Atheist" (2011, New York, Spiegel and Grau).
From the Japanese Zen tradition: Soko Morinaga Roshi's "Novice to Master: An Ongoing Lesson in the Extent of My Own Stupidity", trans. by Belenda Attaway Yamakawa (Boston: Wisdom Publications, 2002)

Of special interest here is the remarkable study by Sarah H. Jacoby, "Love and Liberation: Autobiographical Writings of the Tibetan Buddhist Visionary Sera Khandro" (New York: Columbia University Press, 2014). Dr Jacoby's study draws on the rare autobiographical and biographical writing of Sera Kandro, "one of the few Tibetan women to record the story of her life."  Sera Khandro (1892 - 1940), who studied outside of the monastic disciplines, also wrote the biography of her guru, Drimé Özer.

Selection of spiritual autobiographies
John Bunyan's Grace Abounding
Richard Norwood's Confessions
A Short History of the Life of John Crook
Lawrence Clarkson's The Lost Sheep Found
The Narrative of the Persecution of Agnes Beaumont
William Apess' "A Son of the Forest"
Play of Consciousness: A Spiritual Autobiography by Swami Muktananda
The Confessions of St. Augustine
Robert Bell's “Metamorphoses of Spiritual Autobiography”

Notes

Resources

Caldwell, Patricia. The Puritan Conversion Narrative. Cambridge. 1983.
Damrosch, Leopold, Jr. God's Plot and Man's Stories. Chicago, 1985.
Delany, Paul. British Autobiography in the Seventeenth Century. London,  1969.
Ebner, Dean. Autobiography in Seventeenth-Century England. The Hague, 1971.
Hindmarsh, D. Bruce. The Evangelical Conversion Narrative: Spiritual Autobiography in Early Modern England. Oxford: Oxford University Press, 2005.
Spacks, Patricia Meyer. Imagining a Self: Autobiography and Novel in Eighteenth-Century England. Cambridge: Harvard University Press, 1976.
Starr, G. A. Defoe and Spiritual Autobiography. Princeton: Princeton University Press, 1965.
Augustine, Saint. The Confessions of St. Augustine. Translated by E. B. (Edward Bouverie) Pusey, 2002.
Hunter, J. Paul. “Spiritual Biography.” The Reluctant Pilgrim: Defoe’s Emblematic Method and Quest for Form in Robinson Crusoe. Johns Hopkins Press, 1966.
Bell, Robert. “Metamorphoses of Spiritual Autobiography.” ELH, vol. 44, no. 1, 1977, pp. 108–126.  
Hindmarsh, D. Bruce. The Evangelical Conversion Narrative: Spiritual Autobiography in Early Modern England. OUP Oxford, 2005.
Ashley, George T. (George Thomas). From Bondage to Liberty in Religion: A Spiritual Autobiography. 2010.

External links
Full text of John Bunyan's Grace Abounding  at Project Gutenberg
The Confessions of St. Augustine at Project Gutenberg
The Confessions of St. Augustine at LibriVox
George T. Ashley’s From Bondage to Liberty in Religion: A Spiritual Autobiography at Project Gutenberg
Robert Bell’s “Metamorphoses of Spiritual Autobiography” from ELH at JSTOR

British literature
Christian literary genres